Breakfast at Tiffany's: Music from the Motion Picture is the soundtrack from the 1961 movie Breakfast at Tiffany's starring Audrey Hepburn. The tracks were re-arranged parts of the film music  composed and conducted by Henry Mancini. At the 1962 Academy Awards, Mancini and lyricist Johnny Mercer won Oscars for Best Original Song for "Moon River", while Mancini picked up a second statue for Best Original Score. The album also stayed on Billboards album charts for over ninety weeks.

Background
Because of his success with title themes, such as the theme to the television show Peter Gunn, Henry Mancini was asked by director Blake Edwards to compose the soundtrack to Breakfast at Tiffany's, a symphony jazz soundtrack. A protégé of jazz musician Glenn Miller, he created the Academy Award-winning score for The Glenn Miller Story. After a preview screening of the film an executive from Paramount Pictures was convinced that the song "Moon River" was dead weight and it was due to be cut. Upon learning this, Hepburn responded, "Over my dead body." This response was likely due to the friendly relationship that she had with Mancini. Subsequent to the insistence that the song stay in the film it was not cut and went on to be a hit.

Collaborations
Blake Edwards and Henry Mancini met through Mancini's wife whom Edwards had known for a number of years. After connecting, they decided to collaborate on the television show Peter Gunn, for which Mancini created the title theme. When Edwards learned he would be directing Breakfast at Tiffany’s he chose Mancini as his partner. Their partnership produced successful themes, and they collaborated on numerous other films together.
Johnny Mercer provided the lyrics for the song. The artists had a smooth relationship, which resulted in the creation of the song. After Mancini played the melody for Mercer, he offered three different variations of lyrics and the two decided on a final combination.  
Mancini believed that Hepburn's recording was the best. He is quoted saying, “Moon River was written for her. No one else has ever understood it so completely. There have been more than a thousand versions of "Moon River", but hers is unquestionably the greatest.”* Mancini had respect for Audrey Hepburn, and the feeling was mutual; after watching the film Audrey wrote a letter to Mancini saying, “Your music has lifted us all up and sent us soaring. Everything we cannot say with words or show with action you have expressed for us. You have done this with so much imagination, fun and beauty. You are the hippest of cats - and the most sensitive of composers!”

Track listing
All music composed by Henry Mancini.

Side 1:
 "Moon River"  (Henry Mancini, Johnny Mercer)
 "Something for Cat"
 "Sally's Tomato"
 "Mr. Yunioshi"
 "The Big Blow Out"
 "Hub Caps and Tail Lights"
Side 2:
 "Breakfast at Tiffany's"
 "Latin Golightly"
 "Holly"
 "Loose Caboose"
 "The Big Heist"
 "Moon River Cha Cha"   (Mancini, Mercer)

As with many soundtrack albums by Mancini and others at the time, the album released alongside the film was a re-recording. In 2013 Intrada released the complete score in its original film performance:

 Main Title (Moon River) (3:07)
 Paul Meets Cat (1:24)
 Sally's Tomato (4:57)
 The Big Blowout (1:05)
 Poor Fred (3:22)
 Moon River (Cha Cha) (2:32)
 Latin Golightly (3:05)
 Something For Cat (4:48)
 Loose Caboose – Part 1 (À La Cha Cha) (3:22)
 Loose Caboose – Part 2 (2:11)
 Moon River (Vocal By Audrey Hepburn) (2:03)
 Meet The Doc (With Organ Grinder) (1:37) 
 An Exceptional Person (2:57)
 You're So Skinny (0:57)
 Turkey Eggs (2:43)
 Hub Caps And Tail Lights (2:19)
 Rats And Super Rats (2:27)
 The Hard Way (0:55)
 Rusty Trawler (0:26)
 Holly (1:56)
 A Lovely Place (1:33)
 Bermuda Nights (0:22)
 The Big Heist (4:02)
 After The Ball (1:14)
 Just Like Holly (1:41)
 Wait A Minute (0:44)
 Feathers (1:14)
 Let's Eat (1:39)
 Where's The Cat? And End Title (Moon River) (3:50)
 Moon River (Audrey Hepburn & Guitar) (1:38)
 Moon River (Piano And Guitar) (1:38)
 Moon River (Harmonica And Guitar) (1:36)
 Meet The Doc (Without Organ Grinder) (1:37)
 Piano Practice No. 1 (1:38)
 Piano Practice No. 2 (1:48)
 Piano Practice No. 3 (0:54)
 Moon River (New York Version) (2:01)
 Moon River (Whistling) (0:10)

Personnel
Accordion – Carl Fortina
Bass – Red Mitchell
Chorus – RCA Victor Chorus
Drums – Larry Bunker, Milt Holland, Ralph Collier, Shelly Manne
Guitar – Al Hendrickson, Bob Bain, Laurindo Almeida
Harmonica – Toots Thielemans
Organ – Victor Piemonte
Piano – Jimmy Rowles
Percussion - Lou Singer
Reeds – Gene Cipriano, Justin Gordon, Ronald Langinger, Wilbur Schwartz
Trombone – Dick Nash, George Roberts, Jimmy Priddy, John Halliburton, Karl De Karske
Trumpet – Frank Beach, Joe Triscari, Pete Candoli, Ray Triscari
Vibraphone – Larry Bunker
Accompanied By – Henry Mancini And His Orchestra
Vocals, Guitar – Audrey Hepburn

Chart positions

Certifications

References

1962 soundtrack albums
RCA Victor soundtracks
Henry Mancini albums
Albums conducted by Henry Mancini
Comedy film soundtracks
Romance film soundtracks
Scores that won the Best Original Score Academy Award